Alice Anne LeBaron (b. Baton Rouge, Louisiana, United States, May 30, 1953) is a United States composer and harpist.

Anne LeBaron holds a B.A. in music from the University of Alabama (1974), an M.A. in music from the State University of New York at Stony Brook (1978), and a doctorate in music from Columbia University (1989), where she studied with Chou Wen-chung and Mario Davidovsky. As a Fulbright Scholar in 1980–81, she studied with Mauricio Kagel and György Ligeti . LeBaron has also studied Korean traditional music at The National Center for Korean Traditional Performing Arts in Seoul (1983) . Although trained in piano from childhood, she took up the harp in college; in 1974 and 1976, she studied privately with Alice Chalifoux at the Salzedo Harp Colony.

LeBaron served as composer-in-residence in Washington, DC, sponsored by Meet the Composer from 1993 until 1996 . She was assistant professor of music at the University of Pittsburgh from 1996 to 2000. Beginning in 2001, she was appointed Professor of Music at the California Institute of the Arts, where she has held the Roy E. Disney Family Chair in Musical Composition since 2013. Her awards include an ASCAP Foundation Grant and a BMI Student Composer Award (1979), the GEDOK International Prize in Mannheim (1982), a Guggenheim Fellowship (1991–1992), the Alpert Award in the Arts (1996–1997), a Cultural Exchange International Grant in 2009 from the City of Los Angeles Department of Cultural Affairs for The Silent Steppe Cantata (2011), and the Toulmin Grant from Opera America (2014).

Composition
LeBaron's composition in instrumental, electronic, and performance realms embraces a wide range of media and styles. Frequently combining tonal and atonal techniques, she has utilized elements of blues, jazz, pop, rock, and folk music in such scores as the opera The E & O Line (1993), American Icons (1996) for orchestra, and Traces of Mississippi (2000) for chorus, orchestra, poet narrators, and rap artists. She has also used American literary sources with Devil in the Belfry (1993) for violin and piano, inspired by Edgar Allan Poe, and the Gertrude Stein setting Is Money Money (2000) for soprano and chamber ensemble. Among her multi-cultural compositions are Lamentation/Invocation (1984) for baritone and three instruments, using Korean-derived gestures and long sustained tones for the voice; Noh Reflections (1985) for string trio, which draws upon the music of Japanese Noh theater; Breathtails (2012) for baritone, string quartet, and Japanese shakuhachi; and her large-scale celebration of Kazakhstan, The Silent Steppe Cantata for tenor, women's chorus, and an orchestra of traditional Kazakh instruments.

Writing about LeBaron's 1989 Telluris Theoria Sacra (for flute/piccolo, clarinet/bass clarinet, violin, viola, cello, percussion, and piano), musicologist Susan McClary notes that the work "...points to LeBaron's more pervasive interest in music's ability to mold temporality, immersing the listener in a sound world in which time bends, stands still, dances, or conforms to the mechanical measure of the clock" .

Theater has played an important role in LeBaron's music, with such scores as Concerto for Active Frogs (1974) for voices, three instruments, and tape, and the harp solos I Am an American ... My Government Will Reward You (1988) and Hsing (2002). She has also composed a series of monodramas for female voice and chamber musicians: Pope Joan (2000), Transfiguration (2003), Sucktion (2008), and Some Things Should Not Move (2013). LeBaron's operas The E & O Line, Croak (The Last Frog) (1996), and Wet (2005) were all collaborative works that led her to develop the genre she terms "hyperopera": "an opera resulting from intensive collaboration across all the disciplines essential for producing opera in the 21st century – in a word, a 'meta-collaborative' undertaking" .

With her hyperopera Crescent City (2012, libretto by Douglas Kearney), LeBaron went a step beyond the nineteenth-century concept of the Gesamtkunstwerk (the united/total/universal artwork that synthesized architecture, scenic painting, singing, instrumental music, poetry, drama, and dance), championed by Richard Wagner. A more lateral, inclusive, and intensive collaboration of artists occurs with hyperopera, breaking down the usual hierarchical structures of traditional opera, which define and limit the roles of individuals on creative and production teams. The genre of hyperopera involves the collaborations of a diverse group of artists that can portray a variety of meanings or realities . In the postmodern tradition of redefining opera, also seen in the work of Robert Ashley, Meredith Monk, and Robert Wilson, LeBaron replaced the Wagnerian orchestra with smaller and more specialized forces of instruments and electronic sound for Crescent City, with musicians who move readily among stylistic genres, just as the vocalists do. The opera's theatrical action is refracted through a prism of video work, lighting effects, and performance freedoms and simultaneities. For its world premiere production in Los Angeles in 2012, Crescent City also engaged six visual artists to participate in the collaborative process by designing and building set pieces as various locales in the opera.

Improvisation
As an improviser LeBaron employs a wide array of extended techniques for the harp, including preparing the harp (similar to John Cage's prepared piano) and bowing the strings, as well as a variety of electronic enhancements. Her development of a new performance vocabulary for the instrument began in the early 1970s, when she played in the Alabama improvising ensemble Trans Museq along with Davey Williams and LaDonna Smith. Her career as an improviser has included performance collaborations with such creative composer/musicians as Anthony Braxton, Muhal Richard Abrams, Evan Parker, George E. Lewis, Derek Bailey, Leroy Jenkins, Lionel Hampton, and Shelley Hirsch. LeBaron's double-CD 1, 2, 4, 3 (Innova 236, 2010) features collaborations with thirteen different musicians in solo, duo, quartet, and trio configurations.

Major works

Chamber: Instrumental
 Concerto for Active Frogs (1974) for three instruments, chorus, bass/baritone soloist, electronic tape
 Three Motion Atmospheres (1974) for brass quintet
 Extensions (1976) for twelve percussionists, piano, harp
 Memnon (1976) for harp sextet
 Metamorphosis (1977) for piccolo/flute, oboe, clarinet, horn, trombone, harp, percussion
 Rite of the Black Sun (1980) for percussion quartet
 After a Dammit to Hell (1982) for bassoon solo
 Noh Reflections (1985) for string trio
 Telluris Theoria Sacra (1989) for flute, clarinet, violin, viola, cello, piano, percussion
 Waltz for Quintet (1989) for flute, violin, viola, cello, piano
 Southern Ephemera (1993) for flute, cello, harmonic canon, surrogate kithara
 Devil in the Belfry (1993) for violin, piano
 Sukey (1994) for string quartet
 Solar Music (1994) for flute, harp
 Sukey and the Mermaid (1998) for string quartet, children's choir, narrator
 Hsing (2002) for harp solo
 Los Murmullos (2006) for piano
 Four (2009) for violin solo
 Fore (2009) for violin solo
 Enigma of Papilio (2010) for piano
 Creación de las aves (2011) for piano
 Blitz (2014) for piano
 Julie's Garden of Unearthly Delights (2014) for two bassoons, electronic file

Chamber: Vocal
 In the Desert (1973) for soprano, flute, marimba, temple blocks
 The Sea and the Honeycomb (1979) for soprano, piccolo/flute, clarinet/bass clarinet, piano, two percussionists
 Lamentation/Invocation (1984) for baritone, clarinet, cello, harp
 Dish (1990) for soprano, electric violin, percussion, electric bass, piano
 Is Money Money (2000) for soprano, clarinet, bass clarinet, violin, viola, cello; set of six call bells
 Transfiguration (2003) for soprano, flute, harp, percussion
 Some Thoughts (2004) for soprano, flute, harp, or soprano, piano
 Breathtails (2012) for baritone, shakuhachi, string quartet

Chamber: Electronic
 Quadratura Circuli (1978) for electronic tape
 Planxty Bowerbird (1982) for harp and electronics
 I Am an American ... My Government Will Reward You (1988) for harp and electronics and live electronics
 Blue Harp Study No. 1 (1992) for electronic tape
 Blue Harp Study No. 2 (1992) for electronic tape
 Sachamama (1995) for flute and electronics
 Sauger (2001) for trombone and electronics
 Inner Voice (2003) for contrabass and electronics
 The Left Side of Time (2004) for trombone and interactive electronics
 Way of Light (2006) for trumpet, video, audio
 Way of Light (2008) for flute, video, audio

Orchestral
 Strange Attractors (1987)
 Southern Ephemera for Orchestra (1994)
 Double Concerto (1995) for two harps (one player) and chamber orchestra
 Mambo (1995) for two orchestras and brass quintet
 Lasting Impressions (1995) for narrator and/or actors and orchestra
 American Icons (1996)
 Traces of Mississippi (2000) for mixed chorus, children's chorus, gospel soloist with pianist, two poet/narrators, two rappers, and orchestra
 Fleeting Shades (2003) for klezmer band and orchestra

Choral
 Light Breaks Where No Sun Shines (1977) for chamber chorus: SATB; SAT soli; two percussionists
 Story of My Angel (1993) for SSAA, soprano solo, piano with live electronics
 Nightmare (1999) for TTBB, tenor solo, piano
 Waterfall at Lu-shan (2010) for SATB
 The Silent Steppe Cantata (2011) for tenor soloist, women's chorus, narrator, two flutes, two accordions, two guitars, three mandolins, percussion, string quartet
 Floodsongs (2012) for SATB

Dance
 Bodice Ripper (1999) for clarinet/bass clarinet, electric harp, electronic tape

Opera
 The E & O Line (1993) for four principals, three-part female chorus, twelve-part mixed chorus, eight instruments, tape
 Blue Calls Set You Free (1994) for one principal, three-part female chorus, piano, tape, optional alto or tenor saxophone
 Croak (The Last Frog) (1996) for six principals, five-part mixed chorus, ten-piece chamber ensemble
 Pope Joan (2000) for soprano, piccolo/flute/alto flute, oboe/English horn, clarinet/bass clarinet, violin, viola, cello, piano, percussion
 Wet (2005) for ten singers, twelve-piece orchestra
 Phantasmagoriettas from Crescent City (2007) for three singers, six-piece ensemble
 Sucktion (2008) for mezzo-soprano, percussion, laptop
 Crescent City (2012) for eight singers, chamber orchestra
 Some Things Should Not Move (2013) for soprano, flute, harp, bass

Bibliography
LeBaron, Anne. "Composing Breathtails." In Current Musicology, 2014.
– "Crescent City: A Hyperopera." In International Alliance for Women in Music Journal, 2013.
– "Down the Rabbit-Hole of Innovation." In UCLA Center for the Study of Women Special Issue: Writing About Music, 2010.
– "The American Composer's Place in the New Grove II." In www.newmusicbox.org, 2002.
– "Reflections of Surrealism in Postmodern Musics." In Postmodern Music/Postmodern Thought, Lochhead, Judy and Auner, Joseph, eds. Routledge, 2002.

Discography
Crescent City (2014). Maria Elena Altany, Lillian Sengpiehl, Ji Young Yang, sopranos; Gwendolyn Brown, contralto; Timur Bekbosunov, Ashley Faatoalia, Jonathan Mack, tenors; Cedric Barry, bass-baritone; Marc Lowenstein, conductor. Innova Recordings 878.
Floodsongs. Included on Floodsongs (2014). Solaris Vocal Ensemble; Giselle Wyers, conductor; Phil Curtis, electronic sound. Albany Records TROY1468.
 1, 2, 4, 3 (2010). Innova Recordings 236.
Pope Joan, Transfiguration (2007). Kristin Norderval, soprano; Mark Menzies, conductor; Lucy Shelton, soprano; Rand Steiger, conductor. New World Records 80663–2.
Is Money Money. Included on To Have and to Hold (2007). Dora Ohrenstein, soprano; Sequitur; Paul Hostetter, conductor. Koch International Classics 7593.
Los Murmullos. Included on Rumor de Páramo (2006). Ana Cervantes, piano. Quindecim Recordings 164.
Sacred Theory of the Earth. (2000) Atlanta Chamber Players, David Rosenboom, conductor; Paula Peace, piano; Christopher Pulgram, violin; Amy Porter, flute; Anne LeBaron, harp. New World/Composers Recordings NWCR 865.
Southern Ephemera. Included on Dance of the Seven Veils (1996). New Band. Music & Arts 4931.
The Musical Railism of Anne LeBaron (1995). New Music Consort, Theater Chamber Players of Kennedy Center; Anne LeBaron, Leon Fleisher, Claire Heldrich, conductors. Mode Records 42.
Dish. Included on Urban Diva (1993). Dora Ohrenstein, soprano. New World Records|New World/Composers Recordings NWCR 654.
Phantom Orchestra (1992). The Anne LeBaron Quintet (Frank London, trumpet; Marcus Rojas, tuba; Davey Williams, electric guitar; Gregg Bendian, drums, vibraphone, percussion; Anne LeBaron, harp with electronics): "Bouquet of a Phantom Orchestra," "Human Vapor," "Superstrings and Curved Space," "Bottom Wash," "Top Hat on a Locomotive," "Loaded Shark." Ear Rational ECD 1035.
Rana, Ritual & Revelations (1992). New Music Consort, Linda Bouchard, Claire Heldrich, Anne LeBaron, conductors; Theater Chamber Players of Kennedy Center, Anne LeBaron, conductor. Mode Records 30.

References

External links
Anne LeBaron's official site
"Composing Breathtails" essay

1953 births
20th-century classical composers
21st-century American composers
21st-century classical composers
American classical harpists
American women classical composers
American classical composers
Living people
American women in electronic music
20th-century American women musicians
20th-century American composers
21st-century American women musicians
20th-century women composers
21st-century women composers